Omar Lakehal (born 5 June 1999) is a Moroccan taekwondo practitioner. He is a gold medalist at the African Games and a silver medalist at the Islamic Solidarity Games and the Mediterranean Games.

Career 

In 2017, at the Islamic Solidarity Games held in Baku, Azerbaijan, he won the silver medal in the men's 58 kg event. At the 2018 African Taekwondo Championships held in Agadir, Morocco, he won one of the bronze medals in the men's 58 kg event.

In 2019, he represented Morocco at the African Games held in Rabat, Morocco and he won the gold medal in the men's 58 kg event. In 2020, he competed in the men's 58 kg event at the African Olympic Qualification Tournament in Rabat, Morocco without qualifying for the 2020 Summer Olympics in Tokyo, Japan.

At the 2021 African Taekwondo Championships held in Dakar, Senegal, he won the silver medal in the men's 58 kg event.

He won the silver medal in the men's 58 kg event at the 2022 Mediterranean Games held in Oran, Algeria.

Achievements

References

External links 
 

Living people
1999 births
Place of birth missing (living people)
Moroccan male taekwondo practitioners
African Games medalists in taekwondo
African Games gold medalists for Morocco
Competitors at the 2019 African Games
African Taekwondo Championships medalists
Islamic Solidarity Games medalists in taekwondo
Islamic Solidarity Games competitors for Morocco
Competitors at the 2022 Mediterranean Games
Mediterranean Games silver medalists for Morocco
Mediterranean Games medalists in taekwondo
21st-century Moroccan people